Konstantin Konik ( – 3 August 1936) was an Estonian politician and surgeon who served as a member of the Estonian Salvation Committee.

Konstantin Konik was born to a working-class family in Tartu; his father made living as a carter. After studying at the Governorate Gymnasium in Tartu, Konstantin Konik graduated from the faculty of Medicine of the University of Dorpat (now University of Tartu) in 1873, and made his doctorate degree at the Odessa University in 1903.

On 8 March 1920 Konik made history at the University of Tartu by giving the first lecture ever made on medicine in Estonian language. The University of Tartu was established as an Estonian institution only in 1919, it had been the University of Dorpat, a Baltic German institution, before, where only German and since the 1880s–90s Russian language had been used.

References

1873 births
1936 deaths
Politicians from Tartu
People from Kreis Dorpat
Estonian Labour Party politicians
National Centre Party (Estonia) politicians
Education and Social affairs ministers of Estonia
Members of the Estonian Constituent Assembly
Members of the Riigikogu, 1932–1934
Estonian surgeons
University of Tartu alumni
Odesa University alumni
Academic staff of the University of Tartu
Burials at Metsakalmistu
Physicians from the Russian Empire